The 2018–19 Formosa Dreamers season was the franchise's 2nd season, its second season in the ASEAN Basketball League (ABL), its 2nd in Changhua County. The Dreamers are coached by Dean Murray in his first year as head coach. The Dreamers play their home games at Changhua County Stadium.

Standings

Roster

Game log

Summer Super 8

Group stage

Hualien Probation Basketball

Group stage

Final

Regular season 

|- style="background:#cfc;"
| 1
| November 18
| @Slingers
| W 77-73
| Tevin Glass (24)
| William Artino (13)
| Malcolm Miller (3)
| OCBC Arena2,000
| 1-0
|-style="background:#cfc;"
| 2
| November 21
| @Eastern
| W 82-80
| Glass, Miller (20)
| Tevin Glass (10)
| Chien, Miller (4)
| Southorn Stadium
| 2-0
|-style="background:#cfc;"
| 3
| November 24
| @Wolf Warriors
| W 107-81
| Malcolm Miller (22)
| William Artino (10)
| Malcolm Miller (12)
| Doumen Gymnasium
| 3-0

|-style="background:#cfc;"
| 4
| December 2
| @Heat
| W 86-85
| William Artino (29)
| William Artino (12)
| Artino, Chen S., Lee (3)
| CIS Arena
| 4-0
|-style="background:#cfc;"
| 5
| December 8
| Eastern
| W 81-71
| 
| 
| 
| Changhua County Stadium
| 5-0
|-style="background:#cfc;"
| 6
| December 9
| Vampire
| W 71-66
| William Artino (26)
| William Artino (19)
| Malcolm Miller (7)
| Changhua County Stadium
| 6-0
|-style="background:#fcc;"
| 7
| December 15
| @Vampire
| L 74-89
| Malcolm Miller (27)
| Tevin Glass (9)
| Chen S., Miller (5)
| Stadium 29
| 6-1
|-style="background:#fcc;"
| 8
| December 21
| @Alab
| L 72-86
| Malcolm Miller (23)
| William Artino (12)
| Malcolm Miller (7)
| City of Santa Rosa Multi-Purpose Complex
| 6-2

|-style="background:#cfc;"
| 9
| January 5
| Knights
| W 82-72
| William Artino (24)
| Tevin Glass (14)
| William Artino (5)
| Changhua County Stadium
| 7-2
|-style="background:#fcc;"
| 10
| January 6
| Slingers
| L 80-88
| Kenneth Chien (23)
| William Artino (13)
| Kenneth Chien (4)
| Changhua County Stadium
| 7-3
|-style="background:#fcc;"
| 11
| January 9
| @Black Bears
| L 110-116
| Tevin Glass (43)
| Chen Hsiao-Jung (9)
| Malcolm Miller (8)
| University of Macau Sports Complex
| 7-4
|-style="background:#cfc;"
| 12
| January 13
| Alab
| W 73-72
| Tevin Glass (24)
| Tevin Glass (9)
| Lee Hsueh-Lin (7)
| Changhua County Stadium
| 8-4
|-style="background:#fcc;"
| 13
| January 16
| @Knights
| L 73-99
| Malcolm Miller (14)
| Tevin Glass (12)
| Cheng, Chien, Miller (3)
| GOR Kertajaya Surabaya
| 8-5
|-style="background:#cfc;"
| 14
| January 20
| @Eastern
| W 92-86
| Malcolm Miller (31)
| Tevin Glass (11)
| Tevin Glass (5)
| Southorn Stadium
| 9-5
|-style="background:#cfc;"
| 15
| January 24
| @Black Bears
| W 122-116
| Artino, Miller (34)
| Artino, Miller (9)
| Malcolm Miller (10)
| University of Macau Sports Complex
| 10-5

|-style="background:#fcc;"
| 16
| February 16
| Heat
| L 72-74
| Tevin Glass (20)
| William Artino (14)
| Lee Hsueh-Lin (7)
| Changhua County Stadium
| 10-6
|-style="background:#cfc;"
| 17
| February 17
| Dragons
| W 82-76
| Tevin Glass (28)
| William Artino (12)
| William Artino (6)
| Changhua County Stadium
| 11-6
|-style="background:#cfc;"
| 18
| February 23
| Eastern
| W 109-101
| William Artino (29)
| William Artino (12)
| Artino, Chen S. (6)
| Changhua County Stadium
| 12-6
|-style="background:#cfc;"
| 19
| February 24
| Wolf Warriors
| W 107-79
| Tevin Glass (25)
| William Artino (12)
| Malcolm Miller (15)
| Changhua County Stadium
| 13-6

|-style="background:#cfc;"
| 20
| March 2
| Black Bears
| W 99-89
| Malcolm Miller (30)
| Tevin Glass (16)
| Lee Hsueh-Lin (8)
| Changhua County Stadium
| 14-6
|-style="background:#cfc;"
| 21
| March 3
| Black Bears
| W 94-84
| Malcolm Miller (35)
| Tevin Glass (14)
| Chen Shih-Nien (7)
| Changhua County Stadium
| 15-6
|-style="background:#cfc;"
| 22
| March 9
| Wolf Warriors
| W 97-78
| William Artino (30)
| William Artino (14)
| Malcolm Miller (9)
| Changhua County Stadium
| 16-6
|-style="background:#cfc;"
| 23
| March 10
| Alab
| W 79-71
| Tevin Glass (27)
| Glass, Miller (12)
| Malcolm Miller (5)
| Changhua County Stadium
| 17-6
|-style="background:#cfc;"
| 24
| March 17
| @Alab
| W 88-74
| Malcolm Miller (27)
| William Artino (10)
| Malcolm Miller (8)
| City of Santa Rosa Multi-Purpose Complex
| 18-6
|-style="background:#cfc;"
| 25
| March 20
| @Wolf Warriors
| W 99-88
| Tevin Glass (24)
| William Artino (14)
| Malcolm Miller (11)
| Shishan Gymnasium
| 19-6
|-style="background:#fcc;"
| 26
| March 24
| @Dragons
| L 96-97
| William Artino (27)
| Tevin Glass (11)
| Malcolm Miller (5)
| MABA Stadium
| 19-7

Playoffs 

|-style="background:#fcc;"
| 1
| March 31
| Vampire
| L 80-83
| 
| 
| 
| Changhua County Stadium
| 0-1
|-style="background:#fcc;"
| 2
| April 3
| @Vampire
| L 68-70
| 
| 
| 
| Stadium 29
| 0-2
|

Player Statistics 
<noinclude>

 Reference：
≠ Acquired during the season

Transactions

Overview

Free Agency

Additions

Subtractions

Awards

End-of-season awards

Players of the Week

References 

Formosa Dreamers seasons
Formosa Dreamers Season, 2018-19